Lone Mountain is a summit in the U.S. state of Nevada.

Lone Mountain was named for the fact it rises high above other nearby summits.

References

Mountains of Elko County, Nevada